The 2004 Rally Japan (formally the Rally Japan 2004) was the eleventh round of the 2004 World Rally Championship season. The race was held over three days between 3 September and 5 September 2004, and was based in Obihiro, Japan. Subaru's Petter Solberg won the race, his 8th win in the World Rally Championship.

Background

Entry list

Itinerary
All dates and times are JST (UTC+9).

Results

Overall

World Rally Cars

Classification

Special stages

Championship standings

References

External links 
 Official website of the World Rally Championship

Japan
Rally Japan
Rallye